A corazón abierto is a Colombian telenovela premiered on RCN Televisión on April 26, 2010, and concluded on August 11, 2011. The series is created by Fernando Gaitán based on the American medical drama created by Shonda Rhimes, entitled Grey's Anatomy.

Plot

Season 1 (2010) 
The aspiring surgeon María Alejandra Rivas (Verónica Orozco) is admitted to the program for interns at the Hospital Universitario of Santa María. Daughter of one of the most famous surgeons of her time, now Alzheimer's diseased, Maria Alejandra should bear the responsibility that gives her his last name. His group of new friends, Jorge Viana (Juan Manuel Mendoza), Cristina Solano (Natalia Durán), Isabel Henao (Sandra Hernández) and Augusto Maza (Juan Pablo Espinosa), will from now on become their new family. María Alejandra faces the loneliness helped by these new people and by the sentimental relationship that she establishes with Andrés Guerra (Rafael Novoa), one of the best surgeons of the hospital.

Cast

Main 

 Rafael Novoa as Andrés Guerra
 Verónica Orozco as María Alejandra Rivas
 Carolina Gómez as Alicia Durán
 Jorge Enrique Abello as Mauricio Hernández
 Jorge Cao as Ricardo Cepeda
 Rolando Tarajano as Javier Burgos
 Juan Pablo Espinosa as Augusto Maza
 Santiago Moure as Germán de la Pava
 Aída Morales as Miranda Carvajal
 Natalia Durán as Cristina Solano
 Juan Manuel Mendoza as Jorge Viana
 Marlon Moreno as Juan Felipe Becerra (season 2)
 Sandra Hernández as Isabel Henao
 Carolina Guerra as Violeta Botero (season 2)
 Iván López as Rafael Gómez (season 2)
 Rodrigo Abed as Javier Burgos
 María Lara as Claudia Torres (season 2)

Recurring 
 Juliana Gómez as Enfermera Nelly 
 Jean Paul Leroux as Sebastián Cárdenas 
 Alejandro López as Santiago
 Brian Moreno as Rolando
 Diego Trujillo as Marcos Perdomo
 Jacques Toukhmanian as Daniel Duque
 Carlos Kajú as Jeison Campos
 Jordana Issa as Usnaby
 Marcela Posada as Laura Cruz
 Lina Castrillón as Sandra Galindo
 María Elvira Arango as Elvira

Premiere
On April 26, 2010, A Corazón Abierto premiered in Colombia to excellent ratings. With a 20.4 rating and 48 share, almost half the television viewing audience in Colombia watched the premiere.

References

2010 telenovelas
2010 Colombian television series debuts
2011 Colombian television series endings
Colombian telenovelas
Grey's Anatomy
Spanish-language telenovelas
Medical telenovelas
Colombian television series based on American television series
Television shows set in Bogotá